In three-dimensional hyperbolic geometry, the alternated hexagonal tiling honeycomb, h{6,3,3},  or , is a semiregular tessellation with tetrahedron and triangular tiling cells arranged in an octahedron vertex figure. It is named after its construction, as an alteration of a hexagonal tiling honeycomb.

Symmetry constructions 

It has five alternated constructions from reflectional Coxeter groups all with four mirrors and only the first being regular:  [6,3,3],  [3,6,3],  [6,3,6],  [6,3[3]] and [3[3,3]] , having 1, 4, 6, 12 and 24 times larger fundamental domains respectively. In Coxeter notation subgroup markups, they are related as: [6,(3,3)*] (remove 3 mirrors, index 24 subgroup); [3,6,3*] or [3*,6,3] (remove 2 mirrors, index 6 subgroup); [1+,6,3,6,1+] (remove two orthogonal mirrors, index 4 subgroup); all of these are isomorphic to [3[3,3]].

Related honeycombs
The alternated hexagonal tiling honeycomb has 3 related forms: the cantic hexagonal tiling honeycomb, ; the runcic hexagonal tiling honeycomb, ; and the runcicantic hexagonal tiling honeycomb, .

Cantic hexagonal tiling honeycomb

Runcic hexagonal tiling honeycomb

Runcicantic hexagonal tiling honeycomb

See also 
 Convex uniform honeycombs in hyperbolic space
 Regular tessellations of hyperbolic 3-space
 Paracompact uniform honeycombs
 Semiregular honeycomb
 Hexagonal tiling honeycomb

References 

Coxeter, Regular Polytopes, 3rd. ed., Dover Publications, 1973. . (Tables I and II: Regular polytopes and honeycombs, pp. 294–296)
 The Beauty of Geometry: Twelve Essays (1999), Dover Publications,  (Chapter 10, Regular Honeycombs in Hyperbolic Space) Table III
 Jeffrey R. Weeks The Shape of Space, 2nd edition  (Chapters 16–17: Geometries on Three-manifolds I,II)
N. W. Johnson, R. Kellerhals, J. G. Ratcliffe, S. T. Tschantz, The size of a hyperbolic Coxeter simplex, Transformation Groups (1999), Volume 4, Issue 4, pp 329–353  
 N. W. Johnson, R. Kellerhals, J. G. Ratcliffe, S. T. Tschantz, Commensurability classes of hyperbolic Coxeter groups, (2002) H3: p130. 

Hexagonal tilings
Honeycombs (geometry)